This is a list of people with most personal votes in Estonian parliamentary elections.

After re-independence

References

Lists of political office-holders in Estonia